Endoconidiophora is a genus of fungi within the Ceratocystidaceae family.

External links 

Microascales
Sordariomycetes genera